Valga Parish is a rural municipality in Valga County. It includes the town of Valga.

Settlements

Town 
 Valga

Boroughs 
 Tsirguliina
 Õru
 Laatre

Villages 
 Hargla
 Iigaste
 Jaanikese
 Kaagjärve
 Kalliküla
 Karula
 Killinge
 Kirbu
 Kiviküla
 Koikküla
Koiva
 Koobassaare
 Korijärve
 Korkuna
 Käärikmäe
 Laanemetsa
 Lepa
 Londi
 Lota
 Lusti
 Lutsu
 Lüllemäe
 Muhkva
 Mustumetsa
 Paju
 Pikkjärve
 Priipalu
 Pugritsa
 Raavitsa
 Rampe
 Rebasemõisa
 Ringiste
 Sooblase
 Sooru
 Supa
 Tagula
 Taheva
 Tinu
 Tsirgumäe
 Tõlliste
 Tõrvase
 Uniküla
 Valtina
 Vilaski
 Väheru
 Väljaküla
 Õlatu
 Õruste

Religion

References